Mandiri Museum is the corporate museum of the namesake Bank Mandiri, located in the old banking district of Jakarta Old Town in northern Jakarta, Indonesia. The museum is housed in the former headquarters of the Netherlands Trading Society, one of the primary ancestor of ABN AMRO. The museum is closed on Mondays and public holidays. It is located next to Museum Bank Indonesia, and right in front of Jakarta Kota Station.

History

The building

The building stands on a 10,039 square meters land. This land was previously owned by the firm Carl Schlieper, who built a large office building and a warehouse. In 1913, the land was purchased by the Factorij. At midnight of December 17, 1920, the Schlieper building caught fire. The damaged building was destroyed later to make way for a new building which will become the Netherlands Trading Society (Nederlandsche Handel-Maatschappij or NHM), also known as "Factorij".

The new building was designed by J.J.J de Bruyn, A.P. Smits and C. van de Linde. Construction started in 1929 and was opened on January 14, 1933 by C.J Karel Van Aalst, the 10th President of NHM. The architecture follows the philosophy of the Dutch Nieuwe Zakelijkheid, a branch of modern architecture close to Art Deco.

The very profitable NHM was finally nationalized in November 1960, after shareholders and management tried to keep it under Dutch control in the 1950s. In December 1960, it became the property of the Department of Export-Import of the Bank Koperasi Tani & Nelayan (BKTN). This became the Bank Export Import Indonesia (or Bank Exim) on December 31, 1968 until the legal merge of Bank Exim, Bank Dagang Negara, Bank Bumi Daya, and Bank Pembangunan Indonesia to become Bank Mandiri in 1999.

The museum
The museum was established by Bank Mandiri on October 2, 1998. Its collection consists of various items related to banking activity and its development in "Tempo Doeloe" (in Indonesia meaning: "Good old days"). Its collection range from colonial bank owned operating supplies, securities, old currencies, old Dutch safe deposit box, and many others. In addition the building's interior, old ornaments, and furniture is kept as it was during the colonial era.

The collection 
The museum hosts a collection of items related to colonial banking activities, such as security documents, numismatics (coin collections), cash counters, and safes from the colonial era. The collection is displayed in exhibits which imitate the old days atmosphere of the bank.

See also 

List of colonial buildings and structures in Jakarta
List of museums and cultural institutions in Indonesia

References

Cited works

Bank Mandiri
Museums in Jakarta
Bank museums
Cultural Properties of Indonesia in Jakarta
Office buildings completed in 1933
1933 establishments in the Dutch East Indies
Museums established in 1998
1988 establishments in Indonesia
Art Deco architecture in the Netherlands
Colonial architecture in Jakarta
Dutch colonial architecture in Indonesia